Maupin Creek is a stream in Franklin and Jefferson Counties in the U.S. state of Missouri. It is a tributary of Big River.

Some say Maupin Creek was named after Mosias Maupin, a pioneer settler, while others believe the creek has the name of William Maupin.

See also
List of rivers of Missouri

References

Rivers of Franklin County, Missouri
Rivers of Jefferson County, Missouri
Rivers of Missouri